Rasiya Tari Radha Rokani Rann Ma is a 2014 Gujarati film, starring Vikram Thakor and Mamta Soni, directed by Hussian Bloch and produced by Mitesh Patel. Vasim Bloch played the antagonist in the film, while Marjina Diwan acted in supporting role.

Plot
The story revolves around a young man who is grew up in the deserts of Kutch and a young girl from a foreign land and how their love story further develops.

Cast
Vikram Thakor
Mamata Soni
Yamini Joshi
Vasim Bloch
Marjina Diwan

Production and release
The film was initially titled Rann but it was later changed to Rasiya Tari Radha Rokani Rann Ma. The film was shot at the different location in Kutch including at the Great Rann of Kutch. It was released on 20 June 2014, and became successful.

Music
The film features six songs composed by Manoj-Vimal duos including "Mara Manada Ni Meet", "Preet Kare Pukar", "Rasiya Tari Radha", "Maya Te Lagadi Sajan" and "Bhale Re Padharya".

Reception
Mamta Soni was nominated for the Transmedia Awards in the Best Actress category.

References

Films shot in Gujarat
2014 films